The sixteenth season of the American adult animated sitcom South Park began airing on Comedy Central on March 14, 2012 and ended on November 7, 2012. It was also the final season to have 14 episodes as well as the final season to have its episodes air in April. Parker was also the director and writer for all episodes.

Episodes

References

External links

 South Park Studios - official website with streaming video of full episodes.

2012 American television seasons